Zhou Kehua (February 6, 1970 – August 14, 2012) was a Chinese gunman suspected of murder and robbery. According to Chinese media, he is believed to be involved in at least nine murder and robbery cases. He was therefore classified as an A-level wanted criminal of the Ministry of Public Security.

Early life
Zhou was born in Jinkou Town, Shapingba District, Chongqing on February 6, 1970. In 1985, at age 15, Zhou was jailed for 14 days on molestation charges. In 2005, he was jailed again for arms trafficking. In 1991, Zhou stole a shotgun in Chongqing. Two years later, he was arrested and sentenced to Re-education through labor for illegal possession of firearms. In 1997, he purchased a Type 54 pistol near the border of mainland China and Burma in Yunnan Province.

Crimes
Zhou is suspected to have killed ten people and robbed millions of yuan in Jiangsu, Hunan and Chongqing between 2004 and 2012.

According to police investigators in Changsha, Zhou Kehua had been a mercenary soldier in Burma until 2004, which explained his familiarity with guns.

Death
After a massive manhunt, Zhou was shot and killed by police on August 14, 2012.

See also
List of serial killers by country
List of serial killers by number of victims

References

1970 births
2012 deaths
Chinese bank robbers
Chinese serial killers
Fugitives
Fugitives wanted by China
Male serial killers
People from Chongqing
People shot dead by law enforcement officers in China